Julián Ramírez (born 28 October 1999) is an Argentine professional footballer who plays as a forward for Deportivo Armenio.

Career

Club
Ramírez began in the ranks of Gimnasia y Esgrima from 2014. He made his professional debut at the Estadio Comandante Andrés Guacurarí against Crucero del Norte on 30 July 2017, featuring for the opening sixty-five minutes of a 0–3 victory. That was his sole appearance throughout 2016–17, with a further three arriving during 2017–18.

International
In 2018, Ramírez received call-ups to train with both the Argentina U19s and Argentina U20s.

Career statistics
.

References

External links

1999 births
Living people
Sportspeople from Jujuy Province
Argentine footballers
Association football forwards
Primera Nacional players
Gimnasia y Esgrima de Jujuy footballers
Deportivo Armenio footballers